The First Battle of Murfreesboro was fought on July 13, 1862, in Rutherford County, Tennessee, as part of the American Civil War. Troops under Confederate cavalry commander Brig. Gen. Nathan Bedford Forrest surprised and quickly overran a Federal hospital, the camps of several small Union units, and the jail and courthouse in Murfreesboro, Tennessee. All of the Union units surrendered to Forrest, and the Confederates destroyed much of the Union's supplies and destroyed railroad track in the area. The primary consequence of the raid was the diversion of Union forces from a drive on Chattanooga.

Background
On June 10, 1862, Union Maj. Gen. Don Carlos Buell, commanding the Army of the Ohio, started a leisurely advance toward Chattanooga. Brig. Gen. James S. Negley and his force threatened the city on June 7–8. In response to the threat, the Confederate government sent Brig. Gen. Nathan Bedford Forrest to Chattanooga to organize a cavalry brigade. By July, Confederate cavalry under the command of Forrest and Colonel John Hunt Morgan were raiding into Middle Tennessee and Kentucky.

Forrest left Chattanooga on July 9 with two cavalry regiments and joined other units on the way, bringing the total force to about 1,400 men. The major objective was to strike Murfreesboro, an important Union supply center on the Nashville & Chattanooga Railroad, at dawn on July 13.

Battle
The Murfreesboro garrison was camped in three locations around town and included detachments from four units comprising infantry, cavalry, and artillery, under the command of Brig. Gen. Thomas Turpin Crittenden, who had just arrived on July 12. Between 4:15 and 4:30 a.m. on the morning of July 13, Forrest's cavalry surprised the Union pickets on the Woodbury Pike, east of Murfreesboro, and quickly overran a Federal hospital and the camp of a detachment from the 9th Pennsylvania Cavalry Regiment. Additional Confederate troops attacked the camps of the other Union commands and the jail and courthouse. By late afternoon all of the Union units had surrendered to Forrest.

Aftermath
The Confederates destroyed much of the Union supplies and tore up railroad track in the area, but the main result of the raid was the diversion of Union forces from a drive on Chattanooga. This raid, along with Morgan's raid into Kentucky, made possible Bragg's concentration of forces at Chattanooga and his early September invasion of Kentucky. The next action at Murfreesboro was the more prominent Battle of Stones River (known as the Battle of Murfreesboro in the South), fought December 31, 1862, to January 2, 1863.

References

National Park Service battle description
 CWSAC Report Update

External links
The first battle of Murfreesboro

Murfreesboro I
Murfreesboro I
Murfreesboro I
Murfreesboro I
Rutherford County, Tennessee
1862 in the American Civil War
1862 in Tennessee
Nathan Bedford Forrest
July 1862 events